1845 Naval Air Squadron (1845 NAS) was a Naval Air Squadron of the Royal Navy's Fleet Air Arm.

References

Citations

Bibliography

External links
 

1800 series Fleet Air Arm squadrons
Military units and formations established in 1944
Military units and formations of the Royal Navy in World War II